Poundmaker may refer to:

 poundmaker, one who makes buffalo pounds
 Chief Poundmaker aka Pitikwahanapiwiyin (1842-1886) Canadian Plains Cree leader
 Poundmaker Cree Nation, Canadian Indian reserve and Treaty 6 First Nation located near Cut Knife, Saskatchewan
 , Canadian River class frigate of WWII
 Poundmaker Trail, Canadian highway from Edmonton, Alberta to North Battleford, Saskatchewan
 Camp Poundmaker,  a camp near Toronto, Ontario, Canada, run by the League for Socialist Action (Canada)

Disambiguation pages